The Preatures were an Australian indie rock band from Sydney, New South Wales, who formed in 2010. The band consisted of lead vocalist and keyboardist Isabella "Izzi" Manfredi, guitarist and vocalist Jack Moffitt, bassist Thomas Champion, and drummer Luke Davison. Vocalist and guitarist Gideon Bensen was a member of the band until 2016. In 2013, the Preatures won the Vanda & Young Global Songwriting Competition with their song "Is This How You Feel?" They disbanded in 2021, following the launch of Manfredi's solo career.

Career
Champion and Moffitt were school friends at Newington College, Sydney, and they met Manfredi at the Australian Institute of Music in 2008. They formed a band together and in 2010, added Luke Davison and Gideon Bensen, calling themselves The Preachers.

In 2012, they changed the spelling of their name to the Preatures to avoid legal complications with other bands using similar names. They signed with Mercury Records and released their debut EP, Shaking Hands. The EP featured the single "Take a Card", written by Manfredi, with Bensen on lead vocals. It was uploaded to Triple J Unearthed.

In 2013, they released their second extended play, Is This How You Feel?, which was preceded by two singles, "Is This How You Feel?" and "Manic Baby". "Is This How You Feel?" attracted considerable success, winning the $50,000 Vanda & Young Global Songwriting Competition, receiving a nomination for an ARIA Award for Best Pop Release, and being voted ninth in Triple J's Hottest 100 of 2013.

The band's debut studio album, Blue Planet Eyes, was released on 30 September 2014, peaking at No. 4 on the ARIA Albums Chart. At the 2015 ARIA Awards, the group were nominated in three categories.

Bensen left the band on good terms in March 2016.

Their second and final studio album, Girlhood, was released on 11 August 2017 by Island Records. It was nominated for the ARIA Award for Best Rock Album. The single "Yanada" was co-written with Darug musician Jacinta Tobin. Along with the release of the single, the Preatures launched a campaign to help the Australian Institute of Aboriginal and Torres Strait Islander Studies raise money to maintain the documentation of Indigenous languages.

Discography

Albums

EPs

Singles

Awards and nominations

APRA Awards
The APRA Awards are presented annually from 1982 by the Australasian Performing Right Association (APRA), "honouring composers and songwriters". They commenced in 1982.

! 
|-
| 2014 || "Is This How You Feel" (Thomas Champion, Luke Davison, Isabella Manfredi, Jack Mofitt)|| Song of the Year ||  || 
|-
| rowspan="2"| 2015 
| "Somebody's Talking" (Gideon Bensen, Thomas Champion, Luke Davison, Isabella Manfredi, Jack Mofitt)
| Song of the Year
| 
| 
|-
| The Preatures (Gideon Bensen, Thomas Champion, Luke Davison, Isabella Manfredi, Jack Mofitt)
| Breakthrough Songwriter of the Year
| 
| 
|-

ARIA Music Awards
The ARIA Music Awards is an annual awards ceremony that recognises excellence, innovation, and achievement across all genres of Australian music.

! 
|-
| 2013
| Is This How You Feel?
| Best Pop Release
| 
|
|-
| 2014
| Two Tone Medley Tour
| Best Australian Live Act
| 
|
|-
| rowspan="3"| 2015
| rowspan="2"| Blue Planet Eyes
| Best Group
| 
| rowspan="3"|
|-
| Best Rock Album
| 
|-
| The Cruel Tour
| Best Australian Live Act
| 
|-
| 2017
| Girlhood
| Best Rock Album
| 
| 
|}

J Awards
The J Awards are an annual series of Australian music awards that were established by the Australian Broadcasting Corporation's youth-focused radio station Triple J. They commenced in 2005.

! 
|-
! scope="row| 2014
| Blue Planet Eyes
| Australian Album of the Year
| 
| 
|}

National Live Music Awards
The National Live Music Awards (NLMAs) are a broad recognition of Australia's diverse live industry, celebrating the success of the Australian live scene. The awards commenced in 2016.

! 
|-
! scope="row"| 2018
| The Preatures
| Live Pop Act of the Year
| 
| 
|}

Vanda & Young Global Songwriting Competition
The Vanda & Young Global Songwriting Competition is an annual competition that "acknowledges great songwriting whilst supporting and raising money for Nordoff-Robbins"; it is coordinated by Albert Music and APRA AMCOS. It commenced in 2009.

! 
|-
! scope="row"| 2013
| Isabella Manfredi for "Is This How You Feel?"
| Vanda & Young Global Songwriting Competition
| style="background:gold;"| 1st
| 
|}

References

External links
  (archived at the Wayback Machine)
 

2010 establishments in Australia
Australian indie pop groups
Australian indie rock groups
Female-fronted musical groups
Musical groups disestablished in 2021
Musical groups established in 2010
Musical groups from Sydney